Luis Cárdenas may refer to:

Luis Cárdenas (footballer), Mexican footballer
Luis Cárdenas (cyclist), Colombian cyclist
Luis Cardenas , American drummer with Renegade
Luis Cárdenas Saavedra, Venezuelan educator